The 1966 FIFA World Cup was the eighth FIFA World Cup, a quadrennial football tournament for men's senior national teams. It was played in England from 11 July to 30 July 1966. England defeated West Germany 4–2 in the final to win its first and only World Cup title. The final had finished at 2–2 after 90 minutes and went to extra time, when Geoff Hurst scored two goals to complete his hat-trick, the first to be scored in a men's World Cup final. England were the fifth nation to win the event, and the third host nation to win after Uruguay in 1930 and Italy in 1934.  World champions  Brazil failed  to go past  the group stage, as they were defeated by Hungary and Portugal.

Two debut teams performed well at the competition – North Korea beat Italy 1–0 on the way to reaching the quarter-finals, where they lost to Portugal 5–3 after leading 3–0. Portugal themselves finished third, losing 2–1 to England in the semi-final. Portuguese striker Eusébio was the tournament's top scorer, with nine goals clinching the golden boot with three goals more than second placed Helmut Haller.

The 1966 World Cup was the first FIFA World Cup held in the English-speaking world. Matches were played at eight stadiums across England, with the final being held at Wembley Stadium, which had a capacity of 98,600. The 1966 event featured the highest number of teams of any international tournament to date, with 70 nations participating.

All 15 African nations who entered the qualifying later boycotted the tournament in protest after FIFA, citing competitive and logistical issues, ruled that there would be no direct qualification for any African team. Prior to the tournament, the Jules Rimet trophy was stolen, but was recovered by a dog named Pickles four months before the tournament began. It was the first World Cup to have selected matches broadcast via satellite to countries on other continents. The final, which was broadcast locally by the BBC, was the last to be shown entirely in black and white.

Background

England was chosen as host of the 1966 World Cup in Rome, Italy on 22 August 1960, over rival bids from West Germany and Spain. This is the first tournament to be held in a country that was affected directly by World War II, as the four previous tournaments were either held in countries out of war theatres or in neutral countries.

Qualification

Despite the Africans' absence, there was another new record number of entries for the qualifying tournament, with 70 nations taking part. After all the arguments, FIFA finally ruled that ten teams from Europe would qualify, along with four from South America, one from Asia and one from North and Central America.

Portugal and North Korea qualified for the first time. Portugal would not qualify again until 1986, while North Korea's next appearance was at the 2010 tournament. This was also Switzerland's last World Cup finals until 1994. Notable absentees from this tournament included 1962 runners-up Czechoslovakia and semi-finalists Yugoslavia.

Qualified teams

The following 16 teams qualified for the final tournament.

AFC (1)

CAF (0)
None participated
OFC (0)
None qualified

CONCACAF (1)

CONMEBOL (4)
 
 
 
 

UEFA (10)
 
  (hosts)

Mascot and match ball 

The mascot for the 1966 competition was "World Cup Willie", a lion wearing a Union Jack jersey emblazoned with the words "WORLD CUP". This was the first World Cup mascot, and one of the first mascots to be associated with a major sporting competition. Willie was designed by freelance children's book illustrator Reg Hoye. The official match ball was produced by Slazenger for the tournament.

Controversies

African boycott
Thirty-one African nations boycotted the tournament to protest a 1964 FIFA ruling that required the three second-round winners from the African zone to enter a play-off round against the winners of the Asian zone in order to qualify for the World Cup, as they felt winning their zone was enough in itself to merit qualification. The Confederation of African Football (CAF) felt that the representation of African nations in the World Cup was unfair, and so they demanded that FIFA guarantee at least one African nation a spot in the finals of the following tournament. They also protested against the readmission of South Africa to FIFA in 1963, despite its expulsion from the CAF due to the Apartheid regime in 1958. As a result of this boycott, FIFA fined CAF 5,000 Swiss francs. Yidnekatchew Tessema, then president of the CAF, responded to this punishment by saying, "FIFA has adopted a relentless attitude against the African Associations and its decisions resemble methods of intimidation and repression designed to discourage any further impulses of a similar nature. In our opinion, the African National Associations ... really deserved a gesture of respect rather than a fine."

South Africa was subsequently assigned to the Asia and Oceania qualifying group before being disqualified after being suspended again due to pressure from other African nations in October 1964. Despite this, after FIFA refused to change the qualifying format, the African teams decided anyway to pull out of the World Cup until at least one African team had an automatic place assured in the World Cup, something which was put in place for the 1970 FIFA World Cup and all subsequent World Cup finals. The Portuguese African colonies of Angola and Mozambique participated for Portugal.

Trophy incident 
The 1966 World Cup had a rather unusual hero off the field, a dog called Pickles. In the build-up to the tournament, the Jules Rimet trophy was stolen from an exhibition display. A nationwide hunt for the icon ensued. It was later discovered wrapped in newspaper as the dog sniffed under some bushes in London. The FA commissioned a replica cup in case the original cup was not found in time. This replica, as well as Pickles' collar, is held at the National Football Museum in Manchester, where it is on display.

Doping
West Germany encouraged and covered up a culture of doping across many sports for decades. The report, titled "Doping in Germany from 1950 to today", links the West Germany national team of 1966, which reached the World Cup final, with doping.

Format
The format of the 1966 competition remained the same as 1962: 16 qualified teams were divided into four groups of four. Each group played a round-robin format. Two points were awarded for a win and one point for a draw, with goal average used to separate teams equal on points. The top two teams in each group advanced to the knockout stage.

In the knockout games, if the teams were tied after 90 minutes, 30 minutes of extra time were played. For any match other than the final, if the teams were still tied after extra time, lots would be drawn to determine the winner. The final would have been replayed if tied after extra time; but if still tied after the replay, the champion would have been decided by drawing lots. In the event, no replays or drawing of lots were necessary.

The draw for the final tournament, taking place on 6 January 1966 at the Royal Garden Hotel in London was the first ever to be televised, with England, West Germany, Brazil and Italy as seeds.

Venues
Eight venues were used for this World Cup. The newest and biggest venue used was Wembley Stadium in north London, which was 43 years old in 1966. As was often the case in the World Cup, group matches were played in two venues in close proximity to each other. Group 1 matches (which included the hosts) were all played in London: five at Wembley, which was England's national stadium and was considered to be the most important football venue in the world; and one at White City Stadium in west London, which was used as a temporary replacement for nearby Wembley. The group stage match between Uruguay and France played at White City Stadium (originally built for the 1908 Summer Olympics) was scheduled for a Friday, the same day as regularly scheduled greyhound racing at Wembley. Because Wembley's owner refused to cancel this, the game had to be moved to the alternative venue in London. Group 2's matches were played at Hillsborough Stadium in Sheffield and Villa Park in Birmingham; Group 3's matches were played at Old Trafford in Manchester and Goodison Park in Liverpool; and Group 4's matches were played at Ayresome Park in Middlesbrough and Roker Park in Sunderland. The stadium construction cost are estimated to be today's equivalent of 19.2 million GBP, additional to 36.22 million GBP for tournament organisation.

The most used venue was Wembley, which was used for nine matches, including all six featuring England, the final and the third-place match. Goodison Park was used for five matches, Roker Park and Hillsborough both hosted four, while Old Trafford, Villa Park and Ayresome Park each hosted three matches and did not host any knockout round matches.

Tournament summary
The opening match took place on Monday 11 July. With the exception of the first tournament, which commenced on 13 July 1930, every other tournament (up to 2018) has commenced in May or June. Before the tournament began, eventual winners England were 9/2 second favourites with bookmakers behind Brazil (9/4), while beaten finalists West Germany were 25/1 outsiders. The final took place on 30 July 1966, the 36th anniversary of the first final. Until 2022, this was the latest date that any tournament had concluded. The reason for the unusually late scheduling of the tournament appears to lie with the outside broadcast commitments of the BBC, which also had commitments to cover Wimbledon (which ran between 20 June and 2 July) and the Open Golf Championship (6 to 9 July).

Group stage

1966 was a World Cup with few goals as the teams began to play much more tactically and defensively. This was exemplified by Alf Ramsey's England as they finished top of Group 1 with only four goals, but having none scored against them. They also became the first World Cup winning team not to win its first game in the tournament. Uruguay were the other team to qualify from that group at the expense of both Mexico and France. All the group's matches were played at Wembley Stadium apart from the match between Uruguay and France which took place at White City Stadium.

In Group 2, West Germany and Argentina qualified with ease as they both finished the group with 5 points, Spain managed 2, while Switzerland left the competition after losing all three group matches. FIFA cautioned Argentina for its violent style in the group games, particularly in the scoreless draw with West Germany, which saw Argentinean Rafael Albrecht get sent off and suspended for the next match.

In the northwest of England, Old Trafford and Goodison Park played host to Group 3 which saw the two-time defending champions Brazil finish in third place behind Portugal and Hungary, and be eliminated along with Bulgaria. Brazil were defeated 3–1 by Hungary in a classic encounter before falling by the same scoreline to Portugal in a controversial game. Portugal appeared in the finals for the first time, and made quite an impact. They won all three of their games in the group stage, with a lot of help from their outstanding striker Eusébio, whose nine goals made him the tournament's top scorer.

Group 4, however, provided the biggest upset when North Korea beat Italy 1–0 at Ayresome Park, Middlesbrough and finished above them, thus earning qualification to the next round along with the Soviet Union. This was the first time that a nation from outside Europe or the Americas had progressed from the first stage of a World Cup: the next would be Morocco in 1986.

Knock-out stages

The quarter-finals provided a controversial victory for West Germany as they cruised past Uruguay 4–0; the South Americans claimed that this occurred only after the referee (who was Jim Finney, from England) had not recognised a handball by Schnellinger on the goal line and then had sent off two players from Uruguay: Horacio Troche and Héctor Silva. It appeared as though the surprise package North Korea would claim another major upset in their match against Portugal at Goodison Park, when after 22 minutes they led 3–0. It fell to one of the greatest stars of the tournament, Eusébio, to change that. He scored four goals in the game and José Augusto added a fifth in the 78th minute to earn Portugal a 5–3 win.

Meanwhile, in the other two games, Ferenc Bene's late goal for Hungary against the Soviet Union, who were led by Lev Yashin's stellar goalkeeping, proved little more than a consolation as they crashed out 2–1, and the only goal between Argentina and England came courtesy of England's Geoff Hurst. During that controversial game (for more details see Argentina and England football rivalry), Argentina's Antonio Rattín became the first player to be sent off in a senior international football match at Wembley. Rattín at first refused to leave the field and eventually had to be escorted by several policemen. Scoreless when Rattin was dismissed, the game was decided by Hurst's headed goal twelve minutes from the end of normal time. This game is called el robo del siglo (the robbery of the century) in Argentina.

All semi-finalists were from Europe. The venue of the first semi-final between England and Portugal was changed from Goodison Park in Liverpool to Wembley, due to Wembley's larger capacity. This larger capacity was particularly significant during a time when ticket revenue was of crucial importance. Bobby Charlton scored both goals in England's win, with Portugal's goal coming from a penalty in the 82nd minute after a handball by Jack Charlton on the goal line. The other semi-final also finished 2–1: Franz Beckenbauer scoring the winning goal with a left foot shot from the edge of the area for West Germany as they beat the Soviet Union.

Portugal went on to beat the Soviet Union 2–1 to take third place. Portugal's third place was the best finish by a team making its World Cup debut since 1934. It was equalled by Croatia in 1998.

Final

London's Wembley Stadium was the venue for the final, and 98,000 people attended. After 12 minutes 32 seconds Helmut Haller put West Germany ahead, but the score was levelled by Geoff Hurst four minutes later. Martin Peters put England in the lead in the 78th minute; England looked set to claim the title when the referee awarded a free kick to West Germany with one minute left. The ball was launched goalward and Wolfgang Weber scored, with England appealing in vain for handball as the ball came through the crowded penalty area.

With the score level at 2–2 at the end of 90 minutes, the game went to extra time. In the 98th minute, Hurst found himself on the scoresheet again; his shot hit the crossbar, bounced down onto the goal line, and was awarded as a goal. Debate has long raged over whether the ball crossed the line, with the goal becoming part of World Cup history. England's final goal was scored by Hurst again, as a celebratory pitch invasion began. This made Geoff Hurst the first player to have scored three times in a single World Cup final. BBC commentator Kenneth Wolstenholme's description of the match's closing moments has gone down in history: "Some people are on the pitch. They think it's all over ... [Hurst scores] It is now!"

England's total of eleven goals scored in six games set a new record low for average goals per game scored by a World Cup winning team. The record stood until 1982, when it was surpassed by Italy's 12 goals in seven games; in 2010 this record was lowered again by Spain, winning the Cup with eight goals in seven games. England's total of three goals conceded also constituted a record low for average goals per game conceded by a World Cup winning team. That record stood until 1994, when it was surpassed by Brazil's three goals in seven games. France again lowered the record to two goals in seven during the 1998 tournament, a record that has since been equalled by Italy at the 2006 tournament and by Spain's two goals conceded during the 2010 tournament.

England received the recovered Jules Rimet trophy from Elizabeth II and were crowned World Cup winners for the first time.

In this World Cup, the national anthems were played only in the final. They were not played in the earlier matches because the organisers (FIFA and the FA) feared that North Korea's presence – a socialist country that was not recognised by the United Kingdom – in the World Cup would cause problems with South Korea. A memo from the Foreign Office months before the finals began stated that the solution would be "denying the visas to North Korean players". The final, held at Wembley Stadium, was the last to be broadcast in black and white.

Match officials
A total of 26 match referees and other officials featured at the event. Despite the event being a worldwide tournament, the majority of the officials were from Europe. Gottfried Dienst refereed the final between England and West Germany.

Africa
 Ali Kandil
Asia
 Menachem Ashkenazi
South America

 José María Codesal
 Roberto Goicoechea
 Armando Marques
 Arturo Yamasaki

Europe

 John Adair
 Tofiq Bahramov
 Leo Callaghan
 Joaquim Campos
 Ken Dagnall
 Gottfried Dienst
 Jim Finney
 Karol Galba
 Juan Gardeazábal Garay
 Rudolf Kreitlein
 Concetto Lo Bello
 Bertil Lööw
 George McCabe
 Hugh Phillips
 Dimitar Rumentchev
 Pierre Schwinte
 Kurt Tschenscher
 Konstantin Zečević
 István Zsolt

Draw

Squads

Group stage

Group 1

Group 2

Group 3

Group 4

Knockout stage

Bracket

Quarter-finals

Semi-finals

Third place play-off

Final

Goalscorers
With nine goals, Eusébio was the top scorer in the tournament. In total, 89 goals were scored by 47 players, with two of them credited as own goals.

9 goals
 Eusébio

6 goals
 Helmut Haller

4 goals
 Geoff Hurst
 Ferenc Bene
 Valeriy Porkujan
 Franz Beckenbauer

3 goals

 Luis Artime
 Bobby Charlton
 Roger Hunt
 José Augusto
 José Torres
 Eduard Malofeyev

2 goals

 Rubén Marcos
 Kálmán Mészöly
 Pak Seung-zin
 Igor Chislenko
 Uwe Seeler

1 goal

 Ermindo Onega
 Garrincha
 Pelé
 Rildo
 Tostão
 Georgi Asparuhov
 Martin Peters
 Héctor De Bourgoing
 Gérard Hausser
 János Farkas
 Paolo Barison
 Sandro Mazzola
 Enrique Borja
 Li Dong-woon
 Pak Doo-ik
 Yang Seung-kook
 António Simões
 Anatoliy Banishevskiy
 Amancio
 Josep Maria Fusté
 Pirri
 Manuel Sanchís
 René-Pierre Quentin
 Julio César Cortés
 Pedro Rocha
 Lothar Emmerich
 Sigfried Held
 Wolfgang Weber

1 own goal
 Ivan Davidov (playing against Hungary)
 Ivan Vutsov (playing against Portugal)

All-star team

Final standings

In 1986, FIFA published a report that ranked all teams in each World Cup up to and including 1986, based on progress in the competition, overall results and quality of the opposition. The rankings for the 1966 tournament were as follows:

References

External links

1966 FIFA World Cup England, FIFA.com
Details at RSSSF
FIFA Technical Report

 
1966–67 in English football
FIFA World Cup tournaments
International association football competitions hosted by England
International sports boycotts
July 1966 sports events in the United Kingdom